General Little may refer to:

Charles A. Little (1854–1920), Maryland National Guard brigadier general
Eric D. Little (fl. 1990s–2020s), U.S. Army brigadier general
Lewis Henry Little (1817–1862), Confederate States Army brigadier general
Louis M. Little (1878–1960), U.S. Marine Corps major general 
Malcolm Orme Little (1857–1931), British Army brigadier general

See also
Isaac Littell (1857–1924), U.S. Army brigadier general
William Haines Lytle (1826–1863), Union Army brigadier general
Attorney General Little (disambiguation)